Simone Tronchin (born 17 October 2002) is an Italian footballer who plays as a midfielder for  club Virtus Verona on loan from Vicenza.

Club career
He started his senior career in Serie D with Montebelluna. On 12 August 2020, he joined the Under-19 squad of Serie B club Vicenza. He began to receive call-ups to the senior squad in late November 2020.

He made his Serie B debut for Vicenza on 4 January 2021 in a game against Brescia, he substituted Jacopo Da Riva in the 89th minute.

On 15 July 2021, he joined Virtus Verona on loan.

References

External links
 

2002 births
Living people
People from Montebelluna
Sportspeople from the Province of Treviso
Footballers from Veneto
Italian footballers
Association football midfielders
Serie B players
Serie C players
Serie D players
Calcio Montebelluna players
L.R. Vicenza players
Virtus Verona players